E 462 is a European B class road in Czech Republic and Poland, connecting the cities Brno – Olomouc – Český Těšín - Katowice – Kraków

Route and E-road junctions
 
 Brno:  E60, E65, E461
 Olomouc:  E442 
 Český Těšín:  E75
 Katowice:  E75

 Kraków:  E40, E77

External links 
 UN Economic Commission for Europe: Overall Map of E-road Network (2007)
 International E-road network

International E-road network
Roads in the Czech Republic
Roads in Poland